Mizuki Saihara (born 2 December 1997) is a Japanese professional footballer who plays as a midfielder for WE League club Sanfrecce Hiroshima Regina.

Club career 
Saihara made her WE League debut on 16 October 2021.

References 

Living people
1997 births
Japanese women's footballers
Women's association football midfielders
Sanfrecce Hiroshima Regina players
WE League players
Association football people from Hiroshima Prefecture